Vincze is a Hungarian surname. Notable people with the surname include:

Ernie Vincze (born 1942), Hungarian cinematographer
Gábor Vincze (born 1976), Hungarian footballer
Ilona Vincze-Kraus (1902–1998), Hungarian classical pianist
Ion Vincze (1910–1996), Romanian communist politician and diplomat
István Vincze (born 1967), Hungarian footballer
Jenő Vincze (1908–1988), Hungarian footballer and manager
Lajos Vincze (1898–1961) Hungarian staff colonel, scout troop officer
László Vincze, Hungarian sprint canoer
Lilla Vincze (born 1961), Hungarian singer
Melinda Vincze (born 1983), Hungarian handball player
Ottó Vincze (born 1974), Hungarian footballer
Zoltán Vincze (born 1974), Hungarian footballer
Zsigmond Vincze (1874–1935), Hungarian pianist, conductor and composer

Hungarian-language surnames